A Golden Field of Radioactive Crows is the title of The 77s' twelfth album, released in 2001 on the band's own Fools of the World label, with distribution through Galaxy21 Music.

Track listing
 "Genuine"
 "Down From You"
 "U R Trippin'"
 "One More Time"
 "Rise"
 "Leaving"
 "Mr. Magoo"
 "Related"
 "I've Got"
 "There Forever"
 "Mean Green Season"
 "Begin"

Personnel 

The band
 Mike Roe – guitars and lead vocals
 Mark Harmon – bass guitars and background vocals
 Bruce Spencer – drums, percussion and vocals
Production
 Scott Reams – additional production, inspiration, technical wizardry and percussion
 Brian Heydn – art and design, art direction
 The 77s – art direction
 Chris Knight – photography
 Ralph Stover – mixing and mastering

References 

2001 albums
The 77s albums